William Bunce  (April 1877 – unknown) was an English footballer who played as a full-back. Born in Swallowfield, Berkshire, he played for Rochdale Athletic, Stockport County and Manchester United.

External links
Profile at MUFCInfo.com

1877 births
Year of death missing
English footballers
Association football defenders
Stockport County F.C. players
Manchester United F.C. players